Sismanogleio General Hospital (Γενικό Νοσοκομείο Σισμανόγλειο) in Vrilissia, Athens is one of the largest public hospitals in Greece. Its name in Katharevousa is Sismanogleion (Σισμανόγλειον).

During the 2009 swine flu pandemic Seismanogleion treated the first swine flu patient in Greece.

References

External links
Home page

Photo related to the first swine flu case in 2009

Hospitals in Athens